Angelo Franzin State School is a public high school located in Águas de São Pedro, São Paulo, Brazil.

References

Schools in Brazil
Secondary schools in Brazil